Chainsaw, a punk zine edited by "Charlie Chainsaw" was published in suburban Croydon in 1977 and ran to fourteen issues before ceasing publication in 1984. A hand-lettered 'n' became a stylised trademark in articles after the 'n' key broke on the editor's typewriter. In addition to a free flexi disc promoting two or three up-and-coming punk bands, 1980s issues featured cartoon strips and two innovative colour covers by Michael J. Weller. 1970s issues featured the cartoon strip 'Hitler's Kids', authored by Andrew Marr using punk nom-de-plume "Willie D" at the beginning of his successful journalistic career. Charlie Chainsaw formed the band Rancid Hell Spawn when the punk zine discontinued.

References 
 Scissors and Glue, Teal Triggs, (The Design History Society/Oxford University Press, 2006)  
 Fanzines, Teal Triggs, (Thames & Hudson, 2010) 

1977 establishments in the United Kingdom
1984 disestablishments in the United Kingdom
Music magazines published in the United Kingdom
Defunct magazines published in the United Kingdom
Magazines established in 1977
Magazines disestablished in 1984
Punk zines
Flexi discs
Periodicals with audio content
Magazines published in London